McMichael Creek is a  tributary of Pocono Creek in the Poconos of eastern Pennsylvania in the United States.

The tributary Appenzell Creek joins McMichael Creek near the village of Sciota.

McMichael Creek drops off the Pocono Plateau and joins Pocono Creek in Stroudsburg.

As of May 2021, it is under new ownership.

See also
List of rivers of Pennsylvania

References

Rivers of Pennsylvania
Pocono Mountains
Tributaries of Brodhead Creek
Rivers of Monroe County, Pennsylvania